Yifei Yang is a Chinese sprint runner. He won the silver medal at the Men's 100 metres T36 event at the 2016 Summer Paralympics, with 12.20 seconds.

References

Living people
Medalists at the 2016 Summer Paralympics
Paralympic silver medalists for China
Athletes (track and field) at the 2016 Summer Paralympics
Paralympic athletes of China
Chinese male sprinters
Year of birth missing (living people)
Paralympic medalists in athletics (track and field)
Athletes (track and field) at the 2020 Summer Paralympics